"Lovin' on You" is a song recorded by American country music singer Luke Combs. It was released in June 2020 as the fourth single from his 2019 album What You See Is What You Get. Combs wrote the song with Thomas Archer, Ray Fulcher, and James McNair.

Content and history
Prior to the album's release, the song appeared on Combs' 2019 EP The Prequel. The song is a honky-tonk, listing various contents that the narrator likes, including his own love interest. Taste of Country writer Billy Dukes said "Repeated choruses aside, this 125-word jam finds Combs listing things he enjoys a fair bit before stating his undying love for being in love with his woman...the list is filled with specific, colorful detail that paints the song and adds strokes to a broader portrait of Combs as an artist."

Combs performed the song on The Tonight Show Starring Jimmy Fallon in July 2020, via footage of him and his band at the Brentwood Skate Center.

Chart performance

Weekly charts

Year-end charts

Certifications

References

2019 songs
2020 singles
Columbia Nashville Records singles
Luke Combs songs
Songs written by Luke Combs